The 2009–10 Botola is the 53rd season of the Moroccan Premier League, also known as the Botola. It began on 28 August 2009.

Overview

Stadia and locations

Table

External links

League at soccerway.com

Botola seasons
Morroco
1